Spilomyia chinensis is a species of Hoverfly in the family Syrphidae.

Distribution
China.

References

Eristalinae
Insects described in 1950
Taxa named by Frank Montgomery Hull
Diptera of Asia